Mauricio Carradini is an expert in strategy and intelligence who served as Presidential Advisor for Communications during Colombian President Álvaro Uribe Vélez's second term.

Education
Mauricio Carradini graduated from Gimnasio Campestre High School. He is an industrial engineer from Universidad de los Andes has a MSc. in public policy and is a PhD(c) in national security strategy and non-conventional war from St Antony's College, Oxford University. He has postgraduate studies in defense planning and resource management at the National Defense University; in civil-military relations at the Naval Postgraduate School and in crises and disasters' management at the Federal Emergency Management Agency.

Professional life
Presidential Advisor for Communications during President Álvaro Uribe Vélez's second term.

He succeeded Jaime Bermúdez. Carradini, Bermúdez and Álvaro Uribe Vélez attended Oxford University at the same time. Strategic Advisor and Special Advisor at the Ministry of Defense in Colombia for six ministers. During his time at the ministry  and participated in projects like the reform of the Military Forces, the design of Plan Colombia, the restructuring of the Ministry, and the military intelligence reform. Media reports announced in 2002 that President Álvaro Uribe Vélez was creating an intelligence vice-ministry at the ministry of defense for Mauricio Carradini. He has been management consultant with Booz•Allen & Hamilton Inc. in the Andean Region and North America.

Academia
He has been lecturer at the University of Los Andes, the Aerial Military Institute (Colombia), the National Defense University, the Colombian Escuela Superior de Guerra and the University of Oxford.

He sits in the Steering Committee of the body overseeing intelligence studies at the University of Oxford, the Oxford Intelligence Group.

References

External links
Official webpage at Presidency of the Republic, Colombia
Interview, El Espectador 2010

Alumni of St Antony's College, Oxford

Living people
Year of birth missing (living people)